Anacampsis scintillella is a moth of the family Gelechiidae. It is found in most of Europe, except Ireland, Great Britain, the Netherlands, Norway, Finland, most of the Baltic region and Poland.

The wingspan is 12–13 mm. Adults are on wing from June to August.

The larvae feed on Helianthemum species.

References

Moths described in 1841
Anacampsis
Moths of Europe
Taxa named by Josef Emanuel Fischer von Röslerstamm